The 1946 Wilmington Clippers season was their seventh season and their fourth season in the American Association. They had a 1-7-2 record which was their worst season.

Schedule 
The table below was compiled using the information from The Pro Football Archives. The winning teams score is listed first. If a cell is greyed out and has "N/A", then that means there is an unknown figure for that game. Green-colored rows indicate a win; yellow-colored rows indicate a tie; and red-colored rows indicate a loss. Games in Italics are Exhibition and do not count towards their record.

References 

Wilmington Clippers
1946 in sports in Delaware
Wilmington Clippers seasons